Dominic David Telford (born 5 December 1996) is an English professional footballer who plays as a striker for  club Crawley Town.

Early life
Telford was born in Burnley and grew up in Clitheroe where he attended Ribblesdale High School. He played youth football for Clitheroe Wolves and also played for Lancashire Schools at Under-16 level, making 12 appearances for them in 2012–13.

Club career

Blackpool
He joined Blackpool as a first-year scholar with the youth team in June 2013 playing regularly for them in his first year with the club. In December, just after his 17th birthday, he was nominated for the League Football Education's goal of the month for November for a goal against Bury which was followed by a second nomination in January 2014 for a goal in December 2013 against Liverpool. The 35-yard chip against Liverpool was also nominated for the goal of the season award in June 2014.

He made his first-team debut for the club on 9 August as an 88th-minute substitute in the opening-day fixture against Nottingham Forest. In only his second substitute appearance for Blackpool, on 28 December, Telford scored his first senior goal, the equaliser in a 1–1 draw with Rotherham United.

Stoke City
Telford joined Stoke City in July 2015 along with Blackpool teammate Mark Waddington. In August 2017 Telford joined League One side Bristol Rovers on loan for the 2017–18 season. He scored his first goals for Bristol Rovers when he scored twice in an EFL Trophy tie against Wycombe Wanderers on 29 August 2017. Telford played 24 times for Rovers scoring five goals as they finished in 13th position.

Bury
Telford joined Bury on a two-year contract in July 2018.
While being used mainly from the substitutes bench during league games Telford became a regular starter in this seasons Checkatrade cup. This led him to the top of the goalscoring charts and earning the nickname "Mr Checkatrade"

Plymouth Argyle
On 11 July 2019, Telford joined up with Ryan Lowe, who had been his manager at Bury, by signing for Plymouth Argyle.

Newport County
On 28 January 2021, Telford joined League Two side Newport County on a permanent 18-month contract. He made his Newport debut in the 2–1 defeat against Harrogate Town in League Two on 30 January 2021 as a second-half substitute. Telford scored his first goal for Newport in the 1–1 League Two draw against Exeter City on 16 February 2021. 

After an impressive month which saw him score eight goals in just six matches, Telford was awarded the EFL League Two Player of the Month Award for October 2021. A further four goals in four matches saw Telford receive the award for a second successive month. On 29 January 2022, Telford scored both goals as Newport defeated Barrow 2–1. This took his league goals tally to 20 for the season, becoming the first Newport player to hit this target in the top four divisions since John Aldridge in the 1983–84 season. In April 2022 Telford and Newport County teammate Finn Azaz were named in the EFL League Two team of the season. Telford finished the 2021–22 season as the top scorer in League Two with 25 league goals. In June 2022 Telford was named in the PFA Team of the Year. Newport offered Telford a contract extension but on 17 June 2022 Telford announced his decision to leave the club.

Crawley Town
On 24 June 2022, League Two club Crawley Town announced that Telford would join the club on a three-year contract upon the expiration of his contract at Newport County. He made his Crawley debut in their 1-0 away loss to Carlisle United on 30th July 2022. He scored his first Crawley goal in their 3-2 win over Stockport County.

Career statistics

Honours
Bury
EFL League Two runner-up: 2018–19

Individual
 PFA Team of the Year: 2021–22 EFL League Two
 EFL League Two Team of the Season: 2021–22
 EFL League Two Top Scorer: 2021–22
 EFL League Two Player of the Month: October 2021, November 2021

References

External links

1996 births
Living people
Footballers from Burnley
English footballers
Association football forwards
Blackpool F.C. players
Stoke City F.C. players
Bristol Rovers F.C. players
Bury F.C. players
Plymouth Argyle F.C. players
Newport County A.F.C. players
Crawley Town F.C. players
English Football League players